Sydney Arthur Fisher,  (June 12, 1850 – April 9, 1921) was a Canadian politician.

Born in Montreal, Canada East, he was educated at the High School of Montreal, McGill University, and finally Trinity College, Cambridge.

A farmer, he first ran for the House of Commons of Canada in an 1880 by-election for the riding of Brome. Although defeated, he was elected in 1882 and 1887. A Liberal, he lost to the Conservative candidate Eugène Alphonse Dyer by 3 votes in the 1891 election. He was elected again in the 1896 election and was re-elected in 1900, 1904, and 1908. He was defeated in 1911 and in a 1913 by-election. From 1896 to 1911, he was the Minister of Agriculture.

There is a Sydney Arthur Fisher fonds at Library and Archives Canada.

He was the uncle of Philip Sydney Fisher.

Electoral record

Electoral history 
By-election: On Mr. Brown's death, 30 May 1913

References

 
 
 Serving Agriculture: Canada's Ministers of Agriculture profile

1850 births
1921 deaths
Canadian Anglicans
Alumni of Trinity College, Cambridge
High School of Montreal alumni
Liberal Party of Canada MPs
McGill University alumni
Members of the House of Commons of Canada from Quebec
Members of the King's Privy Council for Canada
Anglophone Quebec people
Politicians from Montreal